Charles Dawson Ripple (December 1, 1920 – May 6, 1979) was a pitcher in Major League Baseball. He played for the Philadelphia Phillies.

References

External links

1920 births
1979 deaths
Major League Baseball pitchers
Philadelphia Phillies players
Baseball players from North Carolina
People from Columbus County, North Carolina